Pietro Perdichizzi (born 16 December 1992) is a Belgian professional footballer who plays as a centre0back for Belgian First Division A club Westerlo.

Honours 
Westerlo

 Belgian First Division B: 2021–22

References

External links
UEFA.com profile

Living people
1992 births
Sportspeople from Charleroi
Footballers from Hainaut (province)
Association football defenders
Belgian footballers
R. Charleroi S.C. players
Club Brugge KV players
S.V. Zulte Waregem players
K.S.V. Roeselare players
Royal Antwerp F.C. players
Royale Union Saint-Gilloise players
K.V.C. Westerlo players
Belgian Pro League players
Challenger Pro League players